Evan Weinstock (born October 30, 1991) is an American Olympic bobsledder.

Early life
Weinstock was born and raised in Las Vegas, Nevada. His father, Arnold Weinstock, is Jewish. His mother was not. He told Jewish Sports Review that he was raised without a faith, but he had no problem being identified as a Jewish athlete.

High school football
He played high school football as a wide receiver/safety and was the Nevada 4A Football Player of the Year at Del Sol High School in Las Vegas. He became involved in bobsledding by virtue of his participation in the decathlon. His football career ended in high school with a torn labrum that he suffered on a running play.

College, decathlon, pentathlon, and heptathlon
At Brown University (2014), where he majored in Biology, Weinstock set the university record in the decathlon (7,393 points), is second in university history in the pentathlon (5,296 points), and was a four-time Ivy League champion (three times in the decathlon, once in the heptathlon).

Bobsled career
At the IBSF 2016 Bobsled World Championship Team Event with pilot Justin Olsen, he came in 10th in Igls, Austria. At the IBSF 2017 World Championship in Koenigssee, Germany, in the Two-Man with pilot Justin Olsen, he came in tied for 11th, and in the Four-Man for pilot Justin Olsen, he came in 11th.

He competed for the United States in the two-man event at the 2018 Winter Olympics. He and his team came in ninth place in the four-man bobsled, in 3:17.28, and came in 14th in the two-man bobsled.

References

External links
 

1991 births
Living people
American male bobsledders
Olympic bobsledders of the United States
Bobsledders at the 2018 Winter Olympics
American male decathletes
American pentathletes
American heptathletes
Brown Bears men's track and field athletes
Jewish American sportspeople
Jewish male athletes (track and field)
Sportspeople from Las Vegas
21st-century American Jews
21st-century American women